The Limassol Carnival Festival is an annual European carnival event held in Limassol, Cyprus.The event is held 12 days before the start of Lent, on the Sunday before Ash Monday, 50 days before Orthodox Easter. The festival is a colourful 10-day event of people eating, singing, satire, games, wearing costumes, and attending parties. The festival culminates with a large parade, which includes an array of floats traversing the city.

History

Limassol Carnival Festival, which is said to be an old custom traced to pagan rituals, is now held as an entertaining event.  The local belief is that it is a Hellenistic heritage that goes back to pre-Christian times and to an ancient Greek festival honoring Dionysus, the deity of wine and fun. However, the first written reference of the carnival is by Nеоphitos Egklistos, who accuses Cypriots of idolatry and accepting an alien tradition of celebrating the start of the Great Fast. The second historical mention is from Christophor Furkher Nirenberg, whо visited Cyprus in 1566 during a journey to the Holy Land. Nirenmberg was impressed by the carnival parades and told a story about how local noblemen organize amazing feasts, where people dance, sing and have fun. As practiced now in Limassol is a legacy from the Venetians who  ruled over Cyprus during the 15th–16th centuries. Unlike the Carnival of Venice, both adults and children can join the Limassol Carnival and as a rule everyone pours foam on each other in the Old City. The celebrations are held in most towns around the island, but the event held in Limassol is by far the largest and most popular.

After some groups broke the ground rules in 2015, the Limassol municipality does not allow offending groups or floats from starting from the Enaerios junction and may intercept them at a later stage with the help of police and security guards. The new rules are as follows:

 The number of participants in each group should not exceed 500 people 
 Large amount of alcohol is not allowed on the floats
 No DJ is allowed on board the vehicles
 Broadcasting music is forbidden
 Loudspeakers must be tuned into the radio frequency broadcasting music for the parade

The 2021 edition of the festival was cancelled due to the COVID-19 pandemic. Despite this, people arrived to celebrate the festival as they were allowed to have a "mini parade" which saw them remain in their cars and follow the route that the annual parade would usually take. Later in the day, more people arrived and the event turned into a street party, with most attendees ignoring social distancing rules and not wearing masks. Police eventually intervened. Limassol mayor Nicos Nicolaides said that he was "saddened and disappointed" by the behaviour of the attendees. 28 people and two businesses were fined by police.

Importance
Carnival has been celebrated in Cyprus for over a century, regardless of the political or economic conditions of the time. The epicentre of the Carnival in Cyprus is the seafront city of Limassol, the residents of which have a reputation for being the most fun-loving and sociable on the island. Carnival represents a ritual which on the eve of spring affords the opportunity for people to express their faith and optimism for a good year. The municipality conducts a minimum of five events which include an open-air event at Tepak Square. A children's parade is rightly considered to be one of the key events of the carnival and is held on the first Sunday of the festive events. Children customarily dress up in carnival costumes and parade down the streets of Limassol.

On the Grand Carnival parade the floats theme and the singing are commonly satirical. The Carnival King or Queen could be presented as a satirical figure representing social, political and economic conditions of relevance to Cyprus or Europe in general. On the final day which is the Grand Carnival more than 150 floats and an estimated 50.000 people take part in the procession. The city's brass band and groups of drummers and mandolin-toting kantadoroi (serenaders) accompany the Carnival King (or Queen). During 2014 the satirical theme was the Carnival King depicted with Euro signs indicative of the economic crisis in Europe. On an earlier occasion the Carnival Queen was presented as Angela Merkel as they had then considered her responsible for the economic crisis in Cyprus.

Themes
The first week of the festival begins on a Thursday with entry of the King Carnival (as a satirical display it could be a Queen also) in a procession through the town which is decorated for the occasion followed by a grand fancy dress competition of children that is held at the Tsirion Athletic Stadium. The first week also marks the Meat Week (Kreatini), which is the last week for eating meat before Easter. The day the festival starts is also known as "Tsiknopempti" (meaning "Stinky Thursday"), a name attributed to the cooking aromas of meat pervading the streets.
In the second week of the festival, which is called the cheese week (Tyrini), dairy products are consumed. At the end of the week on a Sunday the celebration involves the Grand Carnival parade which is taken through the Makariou III Avenue of Limassol. People from all parts of the island gather to watch the "floats with the serenade and other masqueraded groups."
Throughout the festival period most hotels and clubs in the city hold fancy dress balls and parties. Clowns, cowboys, pirates, dragons, ancient Greeks and medieval knights are popular themes, but pop stars along with characters from the year's hit movies and musicals are also a common sight.

Location
The Limassol Municipality organizes the final Carnival Grand Parade all the way through the Makarios Avenue (approximately 7 kilometers), Limassol's high street.

Images

See also
Masquerade ball

References

Bibliography
 
 
 

Festivals in Cyprus
Limassol
Carnivals in Cyprus
Spring (season) events in Cyprus